Chloroleucon chacoense, the palo barroso or palo overo, is a species of flowering plant in the family Fabaceae. It is found in Argentina, Bolivia, and Paraguay. It is threatened by habitat loss.

References

External links
 https://web.archive.org/web/20110608081912/http://www.ildis.org/LegumeWeb/6.00/taxa/9328.shtml

chacoense
Flora of Argentina
Flora of Bolivia
Flora of Paraguay
Trees of Argentina
Trees of Bolivia
Trees of Paraguay
Vulnerable plants
Taxonomy articles created by Polbot